Loveville is an unincorporated community in St. Mary's County, Maryland, United States, named for A. Kingsley Love, an attorney. It is known for its Old Order Mennonite community, who have a farmers' market/produce auction here, as well as craft shops and an annual quilt auction. Traditions of Loveville, an interior design and furniture store, occupies the Old Loveville Post Office Building. A Maryland Motor Vehicle Administration office is also located here. The postal code for Loveville is 20656

See also
Mennonites in Maryland

References

Unincorporated communities in St. Mary's County, Maryland
Unincorporated communities in Maryland
Mennonitism in Maryland
Old Order Mennonites